The 2023 Army Black Knights football team will represent the United States Military Academy in the 2023 NCAA Division I FBS football season. The Black Knights will be led by tenth-year head coach Jeff Monken and play their home games at Michie Stadium in West Point, New York. They will compete as an independent.

Previous season

The Black Knights finished the 2022 season with a record of 6–6, beating Navy but losing possession of the Commander-in-Chief's Trophy after a loss to Air Force. They were not invited to a bowl as only five of their six wins counted for bowl eligibility, with the sixth coming against their second FCS opponent of the year.

Schedule

Source:

Game summaries

at Louisiana–Monroe

Delaware State

at UTSA

at Syracuse

Boston College

Troy

at LSU

UMass

vs. Air Force

Holy Cross

Coastal Carolina

vs. Navy

References

Army
Army Black Knights football seasons
Army Black Knights